Thomas Sandys may refer to:

 Thomas Sandys, 2nd Baron Sandys (died 1560), English peer
 Thomas Sandys (Gatton MP) (1600–1658), English MP
 Thomas Sandys (merchant) (fl. 1682-1684), English merchant
 Thomas Sandys (Conservative politician) (1837–1911), East India Company and British Army officer and MP for Bootle

See also
 Sandys (surname)
 Thomas Sands (disambiguation)